Windlust ("Wind love"), is a flour windmill in Achthuizen, Oostflakkee, South Holland, Netherlands.

History

The mill was built by Dirk David van Dijk in 1852. From 1933 to 1991 the mill was owned by Van Reijen & Zn, a grain, feed and fertilizer merchant. The mill was shut down and fell into disrepair. It was dismantled around 1970. Starting about 1981 an extensive renovation began.  Many problems were encountered, so the project took much longer than expected. The mill was purchased by the Goeree-Overflakkee Mill Foundation in 1991, and is now back in working order. It has two pairs of millstones, and is operated by volunteers.

Gallery

Notes

Sources

Windmills in South Holland
Tower mills in the Netherlands
Grinding mills in the Netherlands
Windmills completed in 1845